Brutto is a Belarusian punk rock band founded by Siarhei Mikhalok on 1 September 2014 after the demise of the band Lyapis Trubetskoy.

Discography

Studio albums 
 Underdog (12 September 2014)
 Rodny Kraj (2015)
 Рокі (1 May 2017)

Singles 
 BRUTTO (1 September 2014)
 Underdog (9 September 2014)
 Адидас (12 November 2014)
 Железный (12 November 2014)
 Будзь смелым! (15 December 2014)
 Воины света (22 December 2014)
 Гарри (6 January 2015)
 Партизан рок (3 March 2015)
 Рокi (1 March 2017)
 Мельхиор и Каспар (1 October 2019)

Music videos 
 BRUTTO (1 September 2014)
 Underdog (9 September 2014)
 Гири (5 October 2014)
 Мяч (21 October 2014)
 Adиdas (12 November 2014)
 Будзь смелым! (15 December 2014)
 Наша возьме (26 December 2014)
 Партизан рок (3 March 2015)
 Родны Край (1 September 2015)
 Рокi (1 March 2017)
 Папяроска (26 September 2017)
 Годзе (31 October 2017)
 Мельхиор и Каспар (1 October 2019)

Members 
 Siarhei Mikhalok – vocals (2014—present)
 Vitaly Gurkov – vocals (2014—present)
 Sergey (Brazil) – vocals (2014—present)
 Pavel Tretyak (Pasha Lanister) – guitar's, keyboards (2014—present)
 Denys Mel'nik (Left) – guitar, vocals (2014—present)
 Petr Losevskiy (Petya Aist) – vocals (2014—present)
 Denys Sturchenko – bass guitar (2014—present)
 Denys Shurov – drums (2014—present)

References

External links 
 "Brutto" at Vk.com
 "Brutto" at SoundCloud
 Official YouTube channel

Belarusian rock music groups
Musical groups established in 2014
Belarusian ska groups
2014 establishments in Belarus
Belarusian-language singers
Russian-language singers